Kaltim Airlines was an airline in Samarinda, East Kalimantan, Indonesia with its head office located at Samarinda International Airport. The airline's operations included scheduled passenger and cargo services to four destinations, with a fleet of regional aircraft, consisting of British Aerospace 146 and Cessna C208 aircraft. The airline was founded on 17 August 2011 by Awang F. Ishak and Sabri Ramdhani. The airline ceased all operations in 2013.

Destinations

Fleet

Current

References

Defunct airlines of Indonesia
Airlines established in 2011
Airlines disestablished in 2013
East Kalimantan
2013 disestablishments in Indonesia
Indonesian companies established in 2011